Groppello is a red Italian wine grape variety planted primarily in the Lombardy region.

References

Red wine grape varieties